Aquilegia canadensis, the Canadian or Canada columbine, eastern red columbine, or wild columbine, is a species of flowering plant in the buttercup family Ranunculaceae. It is an herbaceous perennial native to woodland and rocky slopes in eastern North America, prized for its red and yellow flowers. It readily hybridizes with other species in the genus Aquilegia.

Description
The fern-like leaves are lobed and grouped in threes, growing from the base and off the flowering stems. They appear in late spring (usually in May and June), nodding on stems above the leaves. The round end of the spur contains nectar, which is sought by butterflies and hummingbirds.

The caterpillars of Columbine Duskywing (Erynnis lucilius) feed on the leaves.

Cultivation
Aquilegia canadensis is a highly decorative plant, valued for its attractive foliage and showy flowers. For this reason it is widely grown outside its native region, in temperate regions of the Northern Hemisphere.

The plant is easily propagated from seed, and blooms the second year from sowing. It is relatively long lived in the garden. It grows well in shade, and in sun with proper moisture.

The cultivar 'Little Lanterns' is half the height of the species.

Other uses
Native American tribes used various parts of red columbine in herbal remedies for ailments such as headache, sore throat, fever, rash caused by poison ivy, stomatitis, kidney and urinary problems, and heart problems. Native American men also rubbed crushed seeds on their hands as a love charm.

Toxicity
Canada columbine contains a cyanogenic glycoside, which releases poisonous hydrogen cyanide when the plant is damaged.

Distribution
USA (AL, AR, CT, DC, DE, FL, GA, IA, IL, IN, KS, KY, MA, MD, ME, MI, MN, MO, MS, NC, ND, NE, NH, NJ, NY, OH, OK, PA, RI, SC, SD, TN, TX, VA, VT, WI, WV), Canada (MB, NB, ON, QC, SK, BC).

Wetland Indicator Status
Wetland is an extremely valuable but limited resource in the USA. The Wetland Indicator Status is used to determine which native plant species can provide information about the presence of wetland in a given area. Essentially if a plant thrives in a particular area, it means there is a greater likelihood of wetland there. Aquilegia canadensis is one such species.

Regions 1-5: Facultative Equally (FAC) likely to occur in wetlands or non-wetlands (estimated probability 34%-66%). 
Region 6:  Facultative Wetland (FACW) Usually occurs in wetlands (estimated probability 67%-99%), but occasionally found in non-wetlands.

Gallery

References

External links

 Native Plant Identification Network
 US Forest Service — Celebrating Wildflowers
 Connecticut Botanical Society
 Missouri Plants
 Illinois Wildflowers
 Michigan Department of Natural Resources
 Floridata
 'Little Lanterns' — Paghat's Garden

canadensis
Flora of North America
Flora of Canada
Garden plants of North America
Plants used in traditional Native American medicine
Perennial plants
Plants described in 1753
Taxa named by Carl Linnaeus